Osprey Wilds Environmental Learning Center (ELC), formerly Audubon Center of the North Woods (ACNW), on Grindstone Lake near Sandstone, Minnesota, is a non-profit residential environmental learning center, wildlife rehabilitation facility, and conference/retreat facility.

On December 30, 2021, Osprey Wilds completed the acquisition of the Blacklock Nature Sanctuary in Moose Lake, MN, located 30 miles north of the main Sandstone campus. The Blacklock property was a gift of  414 acres by Craig and Honey Blacklock. The purchase of additional property adjoining the sanctuary east of Moose Lake added another 148 acres to the acquisition. Both the Sandstone and Moose Lake (Blacklock) campuses include property that is protected by conservation easements through the Minnesota Land Trust.

References

Nature centers in Minnesota
National Audubon Society
Protected areas of Pine County, Minnesota
Education in Pine County, Minnesota
Summer camps in Minnesota
Buildings and structures in Pine County, Minnesota